

The MANIAC I (Mathematical Analyzer Numerical Integrator and Automatic Computer Model I) was an early computer built under the direction of Nicholas Metropolis at the Los Alamos Scientific Laboratory.  It was based on the von Neumann architecture of the IAS, developed by John von Neumann. As with all computers of its era, it was a one-of-a-kind machine that could not exchange programs with other computers (even the several other machines based on the IAS).  Metropolis chose the name MANIAC in the hope of stopping the rash of silly acronyms for machine names, although von Neumann may have suggested the name to him.

The first task assigned to the Los Alamos Maniac was to perform more precise and extensive calculations of the thermonuclear process. In 1953, the MANIAC obtained the first equation of state calculated by modified Monte Carlo integration over configuration space.

In 1956, MANIAC I became the first computer to defeat a human being in a chess-like game.  The chess variant, called Los Alamos chess, was developed for a 6x6 chessboard (no bishops) due to the limited amount of memory and computing power of the machine.

The MANIAC ran successfully in March 1952 and was shut down on July 15, 1958. However, it was  

transferred to the University of New Mexico in bad condition, and was restored to full operation by Dale Sparks, PhD. It was featured in at least two UNM Maniac programming dissertations from 1963. It remained in operation until it was retired in 1965. It was succeeded by MANIAC II in 1957.

A third version MANIAC III was built at the Institute for Computer Research at the University of Chicago in 1964.

Notable MANIAC programmers
 Mary Tsingou - developed algorithm used in the Fermi-Pasta-Ulam-Tsingou problem
 Klara Dan von Neumann - wrote the first programs for MANIAC I
 Dana Scott - programmed the MANIAC to enumerate all solutions to a pentomino puzzle by backtracking in 1958.
 Marjorie Devaney - one of the first MANIAC I programmers.
 Arianna W. Rosenbluth - wrote the first full implementation of the widely used Markov chain Monte Carlo algorithm.
 Paul Stein and Mark Wells - implemented Los Alamos chess.

See also
 List of vacuum-tube computers

References

Brewster, Mike. John von Neumann: MANIAC's Father (archived) in BusinessWeek Online, April 8, 2004.
Harlow, Francis H. and N. Metropolis. Computing & Computers: Weapons Simulation Leads to the Computer Era, including photos of MANIAC I

External links
Photos:

IAS architecture computers
40-bit computers
Vacuum tube computers